Marc Calkin (born 29 November 1979) is a New Zealand cricketer. He played in three List A and seven Twenty20 matches for Wellington and Central Districts from 2009 to 2011.

References

External links
 

1979 births
Living people
New Zealand cricketers
Wellington cricketers
Central Districts cricketers
Cricketers from Masterton